The Bender family, more well known as the Bloody Benders, were a family of serial killers who lived and operated in Labette County, Kansas, United States, from May 1871 to December 1872. The family consisted of John Bender, his wife Elvira and their son John Jr. and daughter Kate. While popular retelling of the story holds that John Jr. and Kate were siblings, contemporary newspapers reported that several of the Benders' neighbors had stated that they claimed to be married, possibly in a common law marriage.

While there is no definitive number, estimates report that the Benders killed at least a dozen travelers before their crimes were discovered. The fate of the family remains unknown, with theories ranging from a lynching of the family to a successful escape. Much folklore and legend surrounds the Benders, making it difficult to separate fact from fiction.

Background
One of the families was John Bender Sr. and John Bender Jr., who registered  of land located adjacent to the Great Osage Trail, which was then the only open road for traveling farther west. After a cabin, a barn with a corral, and a well were built, in the fall of 1871, Elvira Bender and daughter Kate arrived, and the cabin was divided into two rooms by a canvas wagon-cover. The Benders used the smaller room at the rear for living quarters, while the front room was converted into a "general store" where a few dry goods were sold. The front section also contained the kitchen and dining table, where travelers could stop for a meal or even spend the night. Elvira and Kate Bender also planted a  vegetable garden and apple orchard north of the cabin.

Bender family
John Bender, Sr. was around 60 years old and spoke little English. What little he did speak was so guttural that it was usually unintelligible. According to the May 23, 1873 edition of The Emporia News, he was identified with the name of William Bender. Elvira Bender, who also allegedly spoke little English, was 55 years old and so unfriendly that her neighbors took to calling her a "she-devil."

John Bender Jr. was around 25 years old and handsome, with auburn hair and a mustache, and spoke English fluently with a German accent. John was prone to laughing aimlessly, which led many to consider him a "half-wit." Kate Bender, who was around 23, was cultivated and attractive and spoke English well, with little accent. A self-proclaimed healer and psychic, she distributed flyers advertising her supernatural powers and her ability to cure illnesses. She also conducted séances and gave lectures on spiritualism, for which she gained notoriety for advocating free love. Kate's popularity became a large attraction for the Benders' inn. Although the elder Benders kept to themselves, Kate and her brother regularly attended Sunday school in nearby Harmony Grove.

The Benders were widely believed to be German immigrants. No documentation or definitive proof of their relationships to one another, or where they were born, has ever been found. John Bender, Sr. was from either Germany, Norway, or the Netherlands and may have been born John Flickinger. According to contemporary newspapers, Elvira was born Almira Hill Mark (often misreported as "Meik") in the Adirondack Mountains; she married Simon Mark, with whom she claimed to have had 12 children. Later she married William Stephen Griffith. Elvira was rumored to have murdered several husbands, but none of these rumors was ever proven. Kate was purportedly Elvira's fifth daughter. Some of the Benders' neighbors claimed that John and Kate were not brother and sister, but actually husband and wife.

Contemporary descriptions 
From those who knew them and have written about the Benders:

 "The old man was a repulsive, hideous brute, without a redeeming trait, dirty, profane and ill-tempered."
 "Old Mrs. Bender was a dirty old Dutch crone. Her face was a fit picture of the midnight hag that wove the spell murderous ambition about the soul of Macbeth."
 "Young Bender, seen when excited, recalled the grave-robbing hyena at once to mind."
 "Kate proclaimed herself responsible to no one save herself."

She professed to be a medium of spiritualism, and delivered lectures on that subject. In her lectures she publicly declared that murder might be a dictation for good; that in what the world might deem villainy, her soul might read bravery, nobility, and humanity.  She advocated "free love," and denounced all social regulations for the promotion of purity and the prevention of carnality, which she called "miserable requirements of self-constituted society." She maintained carnal relations with her brother, and boldly proclaimed her right to do so in the following words found in her lecture manuscript: "Shall we confine ourselves to a single love, and deny our natures their proper sway?...Even though it be a brother's passion for his own sister, I say it should not be smothered."

Deaths and disappearances 
In May 1871, the body of a man named Jones, whose skull had been crushed and throat cut, was discovered in Drum Creek. The owner of the Drum Creek claim was suspected, but no action was taken. In February 1872, the bodies of two men were found with the same injuries as Jones. By 1873, reports of missing people who had passed through the area had become so common that travelers began to avoid the trail.

The area was already widely known for "horse thieves and villains”, and vigilance committees often "arrested" some for the disappearances, only for them to be later released by the authorities. Many innocent men under suspicion were also run out of the county by these committees.

Downfall
In the winter of 1872, George Newton Longcor left Independence, Kansas with his infant daughter Mary Ann to resettle in Iowa; they were never seen again. In the spring of 1873, Longcor's former neighbor, Dr. William Henry York, went looking for them and questioned homesteaders along the trail. York reached Fort Scott, and on March 9 began the return journey to Independence, but never arrived.

York had two brothers: Ed York living in Fort Scott, and Colonel Alexander M. York, a Civil War veteran, lawyer, and member of the Kansas State Senate from Independence who, in November 1872, had been instrumental in exposing U.S. Senator Samuel C. Pomeroy's bribery of state legislators in his bid for re-election. Both knew of William's travel plans and, when he failed to return, an all-out search began for the missing doctor. Colonel York, leading a company of some 50 men, questioned every traveler along the trail and visited all the area homesteads.

On March 28, 1873, Colonel York arrived at the Benders' inn with a Mr. Johnson, explaining to them that his brother had gone missing and asked if they had seen him. They admitted Dr. York had stayed with them and suggested the possibility that he had run into trouble with Indians. Colonel York agreed that this was possible and remained for dinner. On April 3, Colonel York returned to the inn with armed men after being informed that a woman had fled from the inn after Elvira Bender had threatened her with knives. Elvira allegedly could not understand English, while the younger Benders denied the claim.

When York repeated the claim, Elvira became enraged, said the woman was a witch who had cursed her coffee, and ordered the men to leave her house, revealing for the first time that "her sense of the English language" was much better than was let on. Before York left, Kate asked him to return alone the following Friday night, and she would use her clairvoyant abilities to help him find his brother. The men with York were convinced the Benders and a neighboring family, the Roaches, were guilty and wanted to hang them all, but York insisted that evidence must be found.

Around the same time, neighboring communities began to make accusations that the Osage community was responsible for the disappearances, and Osage township arranged a meeting in the Harmony Grove schoolhouse. Seventy-five locals attended the meeting, including Colonel York and both John Bender Sr. and John Bender Jr. After discussing the disappearances, including that of William York, they agreed to obtain a warrant to search every homestead between Big Hill Creek and Drum Creek. Despite York's strong suspicions regarding the Benders since his visit several weeks earlier, no one had watched them, and it was not noticed for several days that they had fled.

Three days after the township meeting, Billy Tole was driving cattle past the Bender property when he noticed that the inn was abandoned and the farm animals were unfed. Tole reported the fact to the township trustee, but due to inclement weather, several days lapsed before the abandonment could be investigated. The township trustee called for volunteers, and several hundred turned out to form a search party that included Colonel York. When the party arrived at the inn they found the cabin empty of food, clothing, and personal possessions.

A bad odor was noticed and traced to a trap door underneath a bed, nailed shut. They broke up the stone slab floor with sledgehammers, but found no bodies, and determined that the smell was from blood that had soaked into the soil. The men then physically lifted the cabin and moved it to the side to dig under it, but no bodies were found.

They then probed the ground around the cabin with a metal rod, especially in the disturbed soil of the vegetable garden and orchard, where Dr. York's body was found later that evening, buried face down with his feet barely below the surface. The probing continued until midnight, with another nine suspected grave sites marked before the men were satisfied they had found them all and retired for the night. The next morning, another eight bodies were found in seven of the nine suspected graves, while one was found in the well, along with a number of body parts. All but one had their heads bashed with a hammer and throats cut, and newspapers reported that all were "indecently mutilated”. The body of a young girl was found with no injuries sufficient to cause death. It was speculated that she had been strangled or buried alive.

A Kansas newspaper reported that the crowd was so incensed after finding the bodies that a friend of the Benders named Brockman, who was among the onlookers, was hanged from a beam in the inn until unconscious, revived, interrogated, then hanged again. After the third hanging, they released him and he staggered home "as one who was drunken or deranged." A Roman Catholic prayer book was found in the house with notes inside written in German, which were later translated. The texts read "Johannah Bender. Born July 30, 1848," "John Gebhardt came to America on July 1 18??," "big slaughter day, Jan eighth", and "hell departed."

Word of the murders spread quickly, and more than three thousand people, including reporters from as far away as New York City and Chicago, visited the site. The Bender cabin was destroyed by souvenir hunters who took everything, including the bricks that lined the cellar and the stones lining the well.

State Senator Alexander York offered a $1,000 ($ as of ) reward for the family's arrest. On May 17, Kansas Governor Thomas A. Osborn offered a $2,000 ($ as of ) reward for the apprehension of all four.

Killing method
It is conjectured that when a guest stayed at the Benders' bed and breakfast inn, the hosts would give the guest a seat of honor at the table that was positioned over a trap door into the cellar. With the victim's back to the curtain, Kate would distract the guest while John Bender or his son came from behind the curtain and struck the guest on the right side of the skull with a hammer. One of the women would cut the victim's throat to ensure death, and the body was then dropped through the trap door. Once in the cellar, the body would be stripped and later buried somewhere on the property, often in the orchard.  Although some of the victims were wealthy, others carried little of value on them, and it was surmised that the Benders had killed them simply for the sheer thrill.

Testimony from people who had stayed at the Benders' inn and managed to escape before they could be killed appeared to support the presumed execution method of the Benders. William Pickering said that when he had refused to sit near the wagon cloth because of the stains on it, Kate Bender had threatened him with a knife, whereupon he fled the premises. A Catholic priest claimed to have seen one of the Bender men concealing a large hammer, at which point he became uncomfortable and quickly departed.

Two men who had traveled to the inn to experience Kate Bender's psychic powers stayed for dinner, but had refused to sit at the table next to the cloth, instead preferring to eat their meal at the main shop counter. Kate then became abusive toward them, and shortly afterward the Bender men emerged from behind the cloth. At this point the customers felt uneasy and decided to leave, a move that almost certainly saved their lives.

More than a dozen bullet holes were found in the roof and sides of the cabin. The media speculated that some of the victims had attempted to fight back after being hit with the hammer.

Escape
It was confirmed that the family had bought tickets on the Leavenworth, Lawrence & Galveston Railroad for Humboldt. At Chanute, John Jr. and Kate left the train and caught the MK&T train south to the terminus in Red River County near Denison, Texas. From there, they traveled to an outlaw colony thought to be in the border region between Texas and New Mexico. They were not pursued, as lawmen following outlaws into this region often never returned.

One detective later claimed that he had traced the pair to the border, where he had found that John Jr. had died of apoplexy. The elder Benders did not leave the train at Humboldt, but instead continued north to Kansas City, where it is believed they purchased tickets for St. Louis, Missouri.

Several groups of vigilantes were formed to search for the Benders. Many stories say that one vigilante group actually caught the Benders and shot all of them but Kate, whom they burned alive. Another group claimed they had caught the Benders and lynched them before throwing their bodies into the Verdigris River. Yet another claimed to have killed the Benders during a gunfight and buried their bodies on the prairie. No one ever claimed the $3,000 reward ($ as of ), however.

The story of the Benders' escape spread, and the search continued on and off for the next 50 years. Often two women traveling together were accused of being Kate Bender and her mother.

In 1884, it was reported that John Flickinger had committed suicide in Lake Michigan. Also in 1884, an elderly man matching John Bender Sr.'s description was arrested in Montana for a murder committed near Salmon, Idaho, where the victim had been killed by a hammer blow to the head. A message requesting positive identification was sent to Cherryvale, but the suspect severed his foot to escape his leg irons and bled to death. By the time a deputy from Cherryvale arrived, identification was impossible due to decomposition. Despite the lack of identification, the man's skull was displayed as that of "Pa Bender" in a Salmon saloon until Prohibition forced its closure in 1920 and the skull disappeared. Whether John Flickinger was really John Bender is unknown.

Arrests
Several weeks after the discovery of the bodies, Addison Roach and his son-in-law, William Buxton, were arrested as accessories. In total, 12 men "of bad repute in general" would be arrested, including Brockman. All had been involved in disposing of the victims' stolen goods with Mit Cherry, a member of the vigilance committee, implicated for forging a letter from one of the victims, informing the man's wife that he had arrived safely at his destination in Illinois. Brockman would be arrested again 23 years later for the rape and murder of his own 18-year-old daughter.

On October 31, 1889, it was reported that a Mrs. Almira Monroe (a.k.a. Mrs. Almira Griffith) and Mrs. Sarah Eliza Davis had been arrested in Niles, Michigan (often misreported as Detroit) several weeks earlier for larceny. They were released after being found not guilty, but were then immediately re-arrested for the Bender murders. According to the Pittsburgh Dispatch, the daughter of one of the Benders' victims, Mrs. Frances E. McCann, had reported the pair to authorities in early October after tracking them down. Mrs. McCann's story came from dreams about her father's murder, which she discussed with Sarah Eliza. The women's identities were later confirmed by two Osage township witnesses from a tintype photograph. In mid-October, Deputy Sheriff LeRoy Dick, the Osage Township trustee who had headed the search of the Bender property, arrived in Michigan and arrested the couple on October 30, following their release on the larceny charges. Mrs. Monroe resisted, declaring that she would not be taken alive, but was subdued by local deputies.

Mrs. Davis claimed that Mrs. Monroe was Elvira Bender, but that she herself was not Kate, but her sister Sarah; she later signed an affidavit to that effect, while Monroe continued to deny the identification and in turn accused Sarah Eliza of being the real Kate Bender. Deputy Sheriff Dick, along with Mrs. McCann, escorted the pair to Oswego, Kansas, where seven members of a 13-member panel confirmed the identification and committed them for trial. Another of Mrs. Monroe's daughters, Mary Gardei, later provided an affidavit claiming that her mother (then Almira Shearer), under the name of Almira Marks, was actually serving two years in the Detroit House of Corrections in 1872 for the manslaughter of her daughter-in-law, Emily Mark. Records of the incarceration back up this affidavit. At her hearing, Mrs. Monroe denied any knowledge of Shearer or the manslaughter charge and remained incarcerated with her daughter. Originally scheduled for February 1890, the trial was held over to May. Mrs. Monroe now admitted she had married a Mr. Shearer in 1872 and claimed she had previously denied it, as she did not want the court to know that her name was Shearer at that time and that she had a conviction for manslaughter. Their attorney also produced a marriage certificate indicating that Mrs. Davis had been married in Michigan in 1872, the time when several of the murders were committed. Eyewitness testimony was given that Mrs. Monroe was Elvira Bender. Judge Calvin dismissed Mary Gardei's affidavit as she was a "chip off the old block"; he found that other affidavits supporting Gardei's were sufficient proof that the women could never be convicted, however, and he discharged them both. The affidavits and other papers are missing from the file in LaBette County, so further examination is impossible. A number of researchers question the ready acceptance of the affidavit's authenticity and suggest that the county was unwilling to accept the expense of boarding the two women for an extended period. While the two women were certainly criminals and liars, as their own defense attorney admitted, the charges were weak and many people doubted their identification as the Benders.

Victims
 1) May 1871: Mr. Jones. Body found in Drum Creek with a crushed skull and throat cut.
 2–3)  February 1872: Two unidentified men found on the prairie in February 1872 with crushed skulls and throats cut.
 4) December 1872: Ben Brown. From Howard County, Kansas. $2,600 (: $) missing. Buried in the apple orchard.
 5) December 1872: W.F. McCrotty. Co D 123rd Ill Infantry. $38 (: $) and a wagon with a team of horses missing.
 6) December 1872: Henry McKenzie. Relocating to Independence from Hamilton County, Indiana. $36 (: $) and a matched team of horses missing.
 7) December 1872: Johnny Boyle. From Howard County, Kansas. $10 (: $), a pacing mare, and an $850 (: $) saddle missing. Found in the Benders' well.
 8-9) December 1872: George Newton Longcor and his 18-month-old daughter, Mary Ann. Contemporary newspapers reported his name as either "George W. Longcor" or "George Loncher," while Mary Ann is similarly reported as being either eight years old or 18 months old. According to the 1870 census, George and his wife, Mary Jane, were neighbors of Charles Ingalls and family in Independence, while his wife's parents lived two houses away. After the deaths of his infant son, Robert, from pneumonia in May 1871 and his 21-year-old wife, Mary Jane (née Gilmore), following the birth of Mary Ann several months later, George was likely returning to the home of his parents, Anthony and Mary (Hughes) Longcor, in Lee County, Iowa. In preparation for his return to Iowa, George had purchased a team of horses from his neighbor, Dr. William Henry York, who later went looking for George and was also murdered; both were Civil War veterans. $1,900 (: $) missing. The daughter was thought to have been buried alive, but this was unproven. No injuries were found on her body, and she was fully clothed, including mittens and hood. Both were buried together in the apple orchard.
 10) December 1872: John Greary. Buried in the apple orchard.
 11) December 1872: Red Smith. Buried in the apple orchard.
 12) December 1872: Abigail Roberts. Buried in the apple orchard.
 13–15) December 1872: Various body parts. The parts did not belong to any of the other victims found and are believed to belong to at least three additional victims.
 16–19) December 1872: During the search, the bodies of four unidentified males were found in Drum Creek and the surrounds. All four had crushed skulls and throats cut. One may have been Jack Bogart, whose horse was purchased from a friend of the Benders after he went missing in 1872.
 20) May 1873: Dr William York. $2,000 (: $) missing. Buried in the apple orchard.

By including the recovered body parts not matched to the bodies found, the finds are speculated to represent the remains of more than 20 victims.
The search of the cabin resulted in the recovery of three hammers: a shoe hammer, a claw hammer, and a sledgehammer that appeared to match indentations in some of the skulls. These hammers were given to the Bender Museum in 1967 by the son of LeRoy Dick, the Osage Township trustee who headed the search of the Bender property. The hammers were displayed at the Bender Museum in Cherryvale, Kansas from 1967 to 1978, when the site was acquired for a fire station. When attempts were made to relocate the museum it became a point of controversy, some locals objecting to the town being known for the Bender murders. The Bender artifacts were eventually given to the Cherryvale Museum, where they remain in a wall-mounted display case. A knife with a four-inch tapered blade was reportedly found hidden in a mantel clock in the Bender house by Colonel York. In 1923 it was donated to the Kansas Museum of History by York's wife but is not on display; still bearing reddish-brown stains on the blade, it can be seen upon request.

A historical marker describing the Benders' crimes is located in the rest area at the junction of U.S. Route 400 and U.S. Route 169 north of Cherryvale.

Connection to the Kelly Family
According to a news report from contemporary media, an unnamed man from Kansas City, who had investigated the Bender Family's house and the rumors of their deaths numerous times, claimed that The Kelly Family were in fact the Benders. The man further elaborated that all the stories of the latter's capture were made up, supposedly by a group of Confederates, who have also helped the Benders dispose of the murdered victims' horses and wagons. He pointed out that both families' modus operandi, family unit numbers and other evidence proved that they are one and the same.

Connection to Little House on the Prairie
The Ingalls family, made famous in the books and television series Little House on the Prairie, lived near Independence, and Laura Ingalls Wilder mentioned the Bender family in her writing and speeches. In 1937 she gave a speech at a book fair which was later transcribed and printed in the September 1978 Saturday Evening Post and in the 1988 book A Little House Sampler. She mentioned stopping at the inn, as well as recounting the rumors of the murders spreading through their community. She alleged that her father, "Pa Ingalls," joined in a vigilante hunt for the killers, and when he spoke of later searches for them she recalled, "At such times Pa always said in a strange tone of finality, 'They will never be found.' They were never found and later I formed my own conclusions why." Some have cast doubt on the story, saying that Laura would have been only 4 when her family moved away from the area, and that the Benders were exposed in 1873, two years after the Ingalls family left.

Appearances in media
The book "All the Blood We Share: A Novel of the Bloody Benders of Kansas", by Camilla Bruce, published in 2022.
The book "Hell's Half-Acre: The Untold Story of the Benders, a Serial Killer Family on the American Frontier", by Susan Jonusas, published in 2022.
The feature film Bender (2016), produced by JC Guest and directed by John Alexander with Casadelic Pictures. Experimental art house cult thriller starring  James Karen.
 Anthony Boucher's 1943 short story "They Bite" is set at a Western oasis where the "Carkers" once killed and ate travelers; the hypothesis is floated that they were the Benders (who, in this telling, ate their victims) after leaving Kansas. There are still man-eating somethings at the oasis, and the hypothesis is that the Benders linked up with a supernatural power in the desert and became nearly immortal.
 Episode 4 of the 1954 television series Stories of the Century,  titled "Kate Bender," focused on only the son and daughter.
 Candle of the Wicked (1960), by Manly Wade Wellman, novelizes the events leading up to the discovery of the Bender killings.
 Season 4 Episode 22 (1961) of the TV series Maverick titled “Last Stop: Oblivion” has several elements of the historical Benders crimes and how their murders were finally discovered: A young woman is looking for her fiancé who traveled by stage coach and never arrived at his destination. A family runs an inn at a stage coach transfer station. They deny that the young man stayed at their inn, but with the help of Bart Maverick, the young woman discovers that her fiancé and several other travelers have been killed and buried nearby by the innkeeper and his family.
 The Big Valley, Season 3, Episode 6, "Ladykiller" (1967) loosely depicts the story of the Bloody Benders, as "an innkeeper's pretty daughter is the bait used to rob and kill visitors." The inn is separated by a canvas curtain, from behind which the "Bleeck" family kills visitors (seated in a chair of honor) with a hammer. The father is guest star Royal Dano. The daughter is played by Marlyn Mason.
 Michael McDowell's Katie (1982) is loosely based on the Benders. In it, John and Hannah Slape set up a fortune-telling business with their genuinely clairvoyant but homicidal daughter Katie, who uses her talents to determine how much money her clients have before dispatching them with a hammer.
 The Western novel The Hell Benders (1999) by Ken Hodgson focuses on the manhunt for the Benders after the discovery of their crimes.
 In Neil Gaiman's novel American Gods, the main character Shadow and his associates Mr. Nancy and Chernobog visit a clearing near Cherryvale, Kansas. Mr. Nancy tells Shadow that a group of people (the Benders) used to make human sacrifices to Chernobog in the clearing. Chernobog, a Russian deity, drew sustenance and power from the murders because the Benders used his chosen instrument, a hammer.
 The novel Cottonwood (2004), by Scott Phillips, features Kate Bender in a supporting role; the second half of the book takes place during the trial of two alleged surviving members of the Bender family.
 Season 1, episode 15 (2006) of the TV series Supernatural, titled "The Benders," alludes to the historical Benders in a number of ways; set in contemporary Hibbing, Minnesota, it features a family of thrill-killers named Pa, Missy, Lee, and Jared Bender, whose downfall ultimately comes from a sheriff looking for her missing brother.
 In Lyle Brandt's novel Massacre Trail (2009), the Benders are responsible for several homestead killings and are brought down by Marshal Jack Slade.
 In Season 1, Episode 3 (2013) of the Hulu comedy series Quick Draw, the main character, Sheriff John Henry Hoyle, and his deputy, Eli, are trapped and held hostage by the Benders (John Sr., Elvira, and Kate) while investigating a murder.
 Season 2, Episode 2 (2014) of the ID documentary series Evil Kin concerns the Benders; historians, authors, and the director of the Cherryvale Historical Museum are interviewed.
 The eighth episode of The Librarians, titled "And the Heart of Darkness," portrays the Benders as serial murderers who escaped justice by hiding in the magical House of Refuge. Katie (Lea Zawada), portrayed as a teenager rather than a young adult, eventually banished her own family and took possession of the house, using it to remain immortal as she tricked and murdered anyone seeking refuge. She was eventually defeated by the Librarians during a mission in Slovakia and turned into dust by the house's caretaker spirit, who had come to recognize her as an evil influence.
 The novel Hell's Half-Acre by Nicholas Nicastro (2015) retells the murder spree and imagines the origins of the characters, especially Katie Bender.
 The "Hitchcock's Birds, Hope Diamond, Phineas Gang" episode of the Travel Channel's show Mysteries at the Museum discusses the story of the Benders. The Travel Channel lists the episode as Season 3, Episode 11 onscreen through Hulu, but it is listed as Season 2, Episode 19 on the Travel Channel website, and Season 3, Episode 9 on IMDB.
 The Bender Family is mentioned in episode 94 of the podcast My Favorite Murder. Karen Kilgariff discusses the case and theories about the Benders.
 In his Bloodlands short story collection, Harold Schechter covered the Bender family in "Little Slaughterhouse on the Prairie."
 The video game Red Dead Redemption 2 (2018) features the characters Bray and Tammy Aberdeen, who are an allusion to John Jr. and Kate Bender.
 In Fargo (Season 4, Episode 9), outside the entrance to The Barton Arms, a Kansas Historical Marker plaque for “The Mellon Mounds” recounts the story of the Mellon family, who lured unsuspecting travelers into their home, killed them with a hammer, and buried them out back. Though the bodies were found in the spring of 1894, the Mellons were never caught. This is a direct reference to the Benders.
 The story was recounted on Investigation Discovery's True Nightmares: Tales Of Terror, Season 1, Episode 5, "The Doll Collector."
 The movie Cabin in the Woods (2011) features a family that heavily mirrors the Benders as the initial antagonists of the film.
 The metal pioneers Macabre have a song about the Benders, who are said to be of Norwegian ancestry - The Bloody Benders
 Japanese doom metal band Church of Misery open their 2016 album And Then There Were None with a song about the Benders entitled "The Hell Benders".

See also 
 List of fugitives from justice who disappeared
 List of serial killers in the United States
 The Kelly Family (serial killers)

References

Further reading
 Bender: The Complete Saga (Graphic Novel); Michael Frizell (writer) and David Frizell (artist); Skye Press (a Division of Oghma Creative Media); 2018; .
 The Saga of the Bloody Benders; Rick Geary; NBM Publishing; 2008; .
 The New Encyclopedia of Serial Killers; Brian Lane and Wilfred Gregg; Headline Book Publishing; 1996; .
 History of Labette County, Kansas, and Representative Citizens; Nelson Case; Biographical Publishing; 846 pages; 1901.
 "The Bender Family – Some New Light on Their Mysterious Disappearance".  The St. Joseph Weekly Gazette (St. Joseph, Missouri).  Vol. XLIV, No. 7.  16 Feb 1888.

External links
 Bender Knife, Kansas Historical Society
 Bender photo collection
 Bloody Bender Family 1871–1873, Leatherock Hotel
 Photos of the Bender cabin, the graves, and the Bender hammers
 Maps:
 1873 map of Bender claim in Osage township of Labette County, Leatherock Hotel
 1906 Standard Atlas of Labette County, Kansas Historical Society
 1936 Labette County Map, Kansas Department of Transportation
 2018 Labette County Map, Kansas Department of Transportation

1872 in Kansas
1872 murders in the United States
1873 in Kansas
1873 murders in the United States
19th-century American criminals
American male criminals
American serial killers
American murderers of children
Crime families
Crimes in Kansas
Fugitives
Male serial killers
Murder in Kansas
People from Labette County, Kansas
Outlaws of the American Old West